Wang Yan (born May 3, 1971 in Liaoning) is a Chinese race walker, who won the bronze medal over 10 km at the 1996 Summer Olympics in Atlanta. She also won the 1993 IAAF World Race Walking Cup, as well as a silver medal at the 1999 World Championships and a bronze at the 2001 East Asian Games.

She was the world record holder for the 20 km walk from 2001 to 2005. She held the Asian record for the women's 20 km walk with her best of 1:26:22 hours from 2001 to 2012, until it was beaten by Liu Hong.

Achievements

See also
China at the World Championships in Athletics

References

External links
 

1971 births
Living people
Chinese female racewalkers
Athletes from Liaoning
Olympic athletes of China
Olympic bronze medalists for China
Athletes (track and field) at the 1996 Summer Olympics
Athletes (track and field) at the 2000 Summer Olympics
Athletes (track and field) at the 2004 Summer Olympics
World record setters in athletics (track and field)
World Athletics Championships medalists
Medalists at the 1996 Summer Olympics
Olympic bronze medalists in athletics (track and field)
World Athletics Race Walking Team Championships winners
World Athletics U20 Championships winners